The South African Railways Class 16DA 4-6-2 of 1928 was a steam locomotive.

In 1928, the South African Railways placed six Class 16DA steam locomotives with a 4-6-2 Pacific type wheel arrangement in passenger train service. Eight more entered service in 1929.

Manufacturers
Further orders for locomotives similar to the Class 16D Pacific type locomotive were placed for the South African Railways (SAR) in 1928. The design of the earlier engines was modified by the Chief Mechanical Engineer (CME), Colonel F.R. Collins DSO, along the same lines as his design of the Class 15CA Mountain type.

This consisted of a locomotive bar frame which was shorter to end at the front of the firebox, with a bridle casting to create a widened frame extension below the firebox and the cab to the rear dragbox to gain more ashpan room under the firebox.

These redesigned locomotives were designated Class 16DA and were built by two manufacturers in 1928 and 1929. The first six, numbered in the range from 868 to 873, were built in Germany by Hohenzollern Locomotive Works and entered service in 1928. Another eight locomotives, numbered in the range from 843 to 850, were built in the United States of America by Baldwin Locomotive Works and entered service in 1929.

Characteristics
The Hohenzollern and Baldwin-built Class 16DA locomotives basically differed from the predecessor Class 16D only by virtue of its shortened frame and bridle casting, the Class 16D having had a frame extending all the way from the front buffer beam to the rear dragbox. As delivered, they had  diameter coupled wheels and their cylinders were of  bore and  stroke.

Modification
During the 1940s six of these locomotives, three from each manufacturer group, were retyred with  diameter tyres on their coupled wheels. All the modified locomotives remained classified as Class 16DA.

When the larger tyres were fitted, the old tyres were left in position and turned down on the wheel centres to serve as liners and the new tyres were then shrunk on over the liners. The practice of increasing the diameter of coupled wheels, wheel spacing and other considerations permitting, was begun by A.G. Watson during his term in office as CME and was continued by his successors. The reduction of tractive effort caused by the larger wheels was made up by increasing boiler pressures or by fitting larger cylinders or both, as required. This policy resulted in more mileage between heavy repairs, less cost-per-mile on repairs and locomotives capable of higher speeds.

Service
The Class 16DA Pacifics were initially placed in passenger service between Johannesburg and Kimberley where they regularly worked trains like the Union Express and Union Limited, which became the Blue Train after the Second World War. From 1930 the new Henschel-built wide-firebox Class 16DA took over this duty.

In 1939–1940, when new air-conditioned rolling stock was placed in service on the Union Limited and Union Express services between Cape Town and Johannesburg, all the Class 16DA and Class 16E locomotives were transferred to Bloemfontein in the Orange Free State. From here, they continued to work passenger trains north and south, including the Orange Express, until the Class 15F replaced them and they were relegated to suburban and local passenger train work. By the early 1950s, the suburban trains to Lynchfield and Melorane were handled by narrow-firebox Class 16DA locomotives which only occasionally worked mainline passenger trains by then. They were withdrawn from service in 1973.

Four of the Baldwin-built locomotives were sold into industrial service. No. 844 went to Hlobane Colliery in Natal and later to Umgala Colliery. Numbers 845, 847 and 848 went to Wankie Colliery in Rhodesia, where they became numbers 5 to 7 in reverse order. After they were finally withdrawn in 1982, one of these three was plinthed alongside the main North road at Hwange. Another of the Baldwin-built locomotives, no. 850, is plinthed at Theunissen in the Free State.

Works numbers
The table lists the Hohenzollern and Baldwin Class 16DA engine numbers, builders, years built, works numbers and variations in coupled wheel sizes.

Preservation

Illustration

References

1930
1930
4-6-2 locomotives
2′C1′ h2 locomotives
Baldwin locomotives
Hohenzollern locomotives
Cape gauge railway locomotives
Railway locomotives introduced in 1928
1928 in South Africa